Third Set may refer to:
 Third Set (Cedar Walton album)
 Third Set (Oleta Adams album)